Danny Elfman is an American musician, singer-songwriter, and composer. He led the rock band Oingo Boingo from 1976 until its breakup in 1995, but is most known for composing "The Simpsons Theme" and numerous film scores for director and producer Tim Burton, including Pee-wee's Big Adventure (1985), Beetlejuice (1988), Batman (1989), Edward Scissorhands (1990), Batman Returns (1992), The Nightmare Before Christmas (1993), Mars Attacks! (1996), Sleepy Hollow (1999), Planet of the Apes (2001), Big Fish (2003), Charlie and the Chocolate Factory (2005), Corpse Bride (2005), and 9 (2009). Elfman has composed scores for dozens of additional films, a few of which have charted on the Billboard 200 (Batman peaked at #30, Dick Tracy peaked at #194, and Batman Returns peaked at #61).

Elfman's first major recognitions occurred in 1989, when he was nominated by the Emmy Awards for Outstanding Main Title Theme Music for "The Simpsons Theme" and by the Grammy Awards for his film score to Batman (Best Instrumental Composition for the "Title Theme" and Best Score Soundtrack Album for a Motion Picture for the score). From these nominations, he won the Grammy for Best Instrumental Composition. Elfman has been nominated a total of four times by the Academy Awards (including twice for two different scores in 1997), twice by the Emmy Awards and Golden Globe Awards, ten times by the Grammy Awards, five times by the Saturn Awards (from which he won seven awards), and once each by the Annie Awards, British Academy Film Awards, and BMI Film & Television Awards. Overall, Elfman has won 33 awards from 74 nominations.

Academy Awards
The Academy Awards are presented annually by the Academy of Motion Picture Arts and Sciences to recognize excellence of professionals in the film industry. Elfman has received four nominations.

Annie Awards
The Annie Awards is an animation award show created and produced by the Los Angeles, California branch of the International Animated Film Association, ASIFA-Hollywood, since 1972. Originally designed to celebrate lifetime or career contributions to animation in the fields of producing, directing, animation, design, writing, voice acting, sound and sound effects, etc., in 1992 it began to honor animation as a whole, and created the category of Best Animated Feature. New categories were subsequently added for different animation media. Elfman has received one nomination.

BMI Film & Television Awards
Established in 1986, the BMI Film & Television Awards "recognize the composers of the top grossing films and the highest-rated prime time television shows of the past year". Elfman has received 25 awards.

British Academy Film Awards
The British Academy Film Awards is an annual award show hosted by the British Academy of Film and Television Arts (BAFTA). First awarded in 1947, the awards are often cited as the British equivalent to the Academy Awards. Elfman has been nominated twice.

Broadcast Film Critics Association Awards
The Broadcast Film Critics Association Awards, commonly called the Critics' Choice Awards, are bestowed annually by the Broadcast Film Critics Association to honor the finest in cinematic achievement. Nominees are selected by written ballots in a week-long voting period, and are announced in December. Elfman has been nominated twice.

Chicago Film Critics Association Awards
Elfman has been nominated four times.

Emmy Awards
Administered by three sister organizations who focus on various sectors of television and broadband programming (Academy of Television Arts & Sciences, National Academy of Television Arts and Sciences, and the International Academy of Television Arts and Sciences), the Emmy Awards "recognize excellence within various areas of television and emerging media". Elfman has received one award from two nominations.

Golden Globes
The Golden Globe Awards are presented annually by the Hollywood Foreign Press Association (HFPA) to recognize outstanding achievements in the entertainment industry, both domestic and foreign, and to focus wide public attention upon the best in film and television. The formal ceremony and dinner at which the awards are presented is a major part of the film industry's awards season, which culminates each year with the Academy Awards. Elfman has been nominated three times.

Grammy Awards
The Grammy Awards are awarded annually by the National Academy of Recording Arts and Sciences of the United States for outstanding achievements in the record industry. Often considered the highest music honor, the awards were established in 1958. Elfman has received one award from twelve nominations.

Phoenix Film Critics Society Awards
The Phoenix Film Critics Society (PFCS) is an organization of film reviewers from Phoenix-based publications. In December of each year, the PFCS meets to vote on their Phoenix Film Critics Society Awards (first given in 2000) for films released in the same calendar year.

Satellite Awards
Originally known as the Golden Satellite Awards, the Satellite Awards are an annual award given by the International Press Academy to acknowledge the year's "outstanding artists, films, television shows, DVDs, and interactive media". Elfman has received one award from six nominations.

Saturn Awards
The Saturn Award is an award presented annually by the Academy of Science Fiction, Fantasy & Horror Films to honor the top works in science fiction, fantasy, and horror in film, television, and home video. First presented in 1972, the Saturn Awards are voted on by members of the presenting Academy. Elfman has received 7 awards from 16 nominations.

Sierra Awards
The Las Vegas Film Critics Society (LVFCS) is a non-profit organization composed of selected print, television and film critics in the Las Vegas area. The LVFCS presents its Sierra Awards each year for the best in film. Elfman has received one award from two nominations.

World Soundtrack Awards
The World Soundtrack Academy, launched in 2001 by the Flanders International Film Festival to organize and oversee the educational, cultural, and professional aspects of the art of film music, including the preservation of the history of the soundtrack and its worldwide promotion. The World Soundtrack Awards are "distributed annually to mark and celebrate outstanding achievements in scoring music for motion pictures, and to honor other achievements". Elfman has been nominated twice.

20/20 Awards

Other recognitions
2000 – Elfman won Fantasporto's Special Career Award
2004 – Elfman was awarded the Frederick Loewe Award for Film Composing at the Palm Springs International Film Festival
2007 – Elfman received an honorary doctorate from the North Carolina School of the Arts; his commencement speech for the graduating class can be read here
2008 – Elfman won the Composer of the Year award at the Hollywood Film Festival
2015 – Elfman was inducted as a Disney Legend.
2017 – Elfman received the Max Steiner Film Music Achievement Award presented by Hollywood in Vienna.
2022 – Elfman received a Lifetime Achievement Award from the Society of Composers & Lyricists.

References

External links

Elfman, Danny
Awards and nominations